Carapelli (Carapelli Firenze SpA) is an Italian food company, currently owned by Deoleo, S.A, based in Tavarnelle Val di Pesa, which is a small town in the Metropolitan City of Florence, most famous for its extra virgin olive oil. The company was started as a home business in 1893 by Cesira and Costantino Carapelli. Other members of the Carapelli family joined the business and the company rapidly grew in size and popularity, to become the most modernised food company in Italy by the 1940s. Today, Carapelli Firenze SpA is the leading Italian extra virgin olive oil company (with brand such as Carapelli, Sasso, Maya) where 30% of its production is exported to Europe and the Americas.

History

1893: The Beginning
On 23 September 1893, the day of their wedding, 
Cesira & Constantino Carapelli founded the family business with her dowry. With 300 lire the couple bought a warehouse in Montevarchi to trade in grain, oil and other agricultural produce

1939-40: Post War
On the eve of war, the Carapelli family set up the most modern wheat mill of the time just outside Florence, in Ponte a Ema. Right next to it they also built the first oil-pressing factory.
The war and bombardments that destroyed everything did little to curb their efforts and their will to succeed. Reconstruction started in Novoli, which was then open countryside and over the years, a plant was established.

1995: Tavernelle
Carapelli moves production to Tavarnelle Val di Pesa in the Chianti region.

2001: Instituto Nutrizionale Carapelli
The Instituto Nutrizionale Carapelli is a non-profit foundation for scientific research into the olive oil sector and the education and spreading of the awareness of the importance of a correct diet.

Controversy
In 2009, Carapelli filed and lost a lawsuit against a German journalist for publishing proof of bad quality and false labelling of Carapelli olive oils.

In 2010, a study by researchers at University of California, Davis found that Carapelli's Extra Virgin Olive Oil failed to meet "Extra Virgin" standards.

In 2015, Carapelli were once again investigated by the Italian authorities and found guilty of passing off lower quality oil as extra virgin olive oil.

In 2017, Carapelli responded to the accusations by stating that the news on the fake olive oil, that were based on a study made in 2010 by the University of California Davis Olive Center, were not true and that the study was completely discredited by the International Olive Council (IOC) through several statements (see statements in here, since the methodology used was not in line with the IOC standards.

References

External links
 Official website

Food and drink companies of Italy
Food and drink companies established in 1893
Italian brands
1893 establishments in Italy
Companies based in Tuscany
Tavarnelle Val di Pesa